Amory Ide Agnes Hansen (née Scheel) (24 February 1887 – 6 October 1961) was a Danish tennis player who competed in the 1920 Summer Olympics. She was born and died in Copenhagen.

In 1920 she and her partner Erik Tegner finished fourth in the mixed doubles event after losing the bronze medal match to Milada Skrbková and Ladislav Žemla.

In the women's doubles tournament she and her partner Elsebeth Brehm were eliminated in the quarter-finals after losing their match to Marie Storms and Fernande Arendt. Hansen also participated in the singles competition but was eliminated in the second round after losing her match to Élisabeth d'Ayen.

References

External links
 
 

1887 births
1961 deaths
Danish female tennis players
Olympic tennis players of Denmark
Sportspeople from Copenhagen
Tennis players at the 1920 Summer Olympics
20th-century Danish women